Ankeny Plaza, is a historic square located at the intersection of Southwest Ankeny and Naito Parkway in Portland, Oregon's Old Town Chinatown neighborhood, in the United States. It contains Skidmore Fountain.

References

Old Town Chinatown
Southwest Portland, Oregon
Squares in Oregon